This is a list of UConn Huskies baseball seasons. The UConn Huskies baseball team represents the University of Connecticut and is a member of the Big East Conference of the NCAA Division I.  

The Huskies have made five College World Series appearances and 22 appearances in the NCAA Division I Baseball Championship.  Conference records for the six seasons that the Huskies competed in the Eastern Collegiate Athletic Conference are not currently available.

Season results

Notes

Sources:

References

 
Connecticut
UConn Huskies baseball seasons